Lorenzo Zazzeri (born 9 August 1994) is an Italian swimmer. He competed at the 2020 Summer Olympics, in Men's 4 × 100 metre freestyle relay, winning a silver medal.

Career 
He competed in the men's 4 × 100 metre freestyle relay event at the 2018 European Aquatics Championships, winning the silver medal.

References

External links
 

1994 births
Living people
Italian male freestyle swimmers
European Aquatics Championships medalists in swimming
European Championships (multi-sport event) silver medalists
Universiade silver medalists for Italy
Universiade medalists in swimming
Medalists at the 2017 Summer Universiade
Medalists at the 2020 Summer Olympics
Olympic silver medalists for Italy
Swimmers at the 2020 Summer Olympics
Olympic swimmers of Italy
Olympic silver medalists in swimming
Medalists at the FINA World Swimming Championships (25 m)
World Aquatics Championships medalists in swimming
21st-century Italian people
Sportspeople from Florence